MX World Tour Featuring Jamie Little is a motorcycle racing video game, developed by Impulse Games and published by Crave Entertainment and Play It for PlayStation 2 and Xbox in 2005. It features sports and racing commentator Jamie Little on the cover.

Reception

The game received "mixed" reviews on both platforms according to the review aggregation website Metacritic.

References

External links
 

2005 video games
Crave Entertainment games
PlayStation 2 games
Racing video games
Video games based on real people
Video games developed in the United States
Xbox games